Hull Kingston Rovers are a professional rugby league club based in Kingston upon Hull, Yorkshire, England, that competes in the Super League, the top tier of British rugby league. The club has won five league championships, and one Challenge Cup.

Formed in 1882, the club joined the Northern Rugby Football Union in 1897. Hull Kingston Rovers most successful period was during the late 1970s and early 1980s, with Roger Millward leading the club to three league titles between 1978 and 1985, and the club's only Challenge Cup win in 1980. After a period of decline, the club competed in its first Super League season in 2007.

Introduction

Hull Kingston Rovers are one of two professional rugby league teams in Hull. Hull F.C. play on the west side of the city, and Hull KR on the east side, at Hull College Craven Park. The River Hull is the divide between the two. Hull KR's nickname, "The Robins", originates from their traditional playing colours of red and white.

After a ten-year stay in the Super League (2007–2016), they were relegated from the Super League to the Championship in the 2016 season, due to the Million Pound Game.

After winning the majority of their matches in the 2017 Championship season, Hull KR successfully gained automatic promotion back to the Super League, at the first time of asking.

History

19th century
Hull Kingston Rovers began in 1882 when a group of apprentice boilermakers in the Hessle Road area of Hull came together to start a team, Kingston Amateurs. Their first ground was a piece of wasteland in Albert Street, the club started playing in the Hull and District League in the autumn of 1883. By 1885 Kingston Amateurs had played at three grounds, Albert Street, Anlaby Road and finally Chalk Lane. The club name was also changed to Kingston Rovers as they entered the Times Cup in the 1885–86 season.
A number of clubs joined the league and the club entered the new Hull and District Rugby Union Cup, losing to Hull A in the final. The club won its first trophy in the 1887–88 season by winning the Times Cup, beating Selby A in the final. The Hull Kingston Rovers moved to their fourth ground, down Hessle Road.

In 1888–89, 6,000 fans turned up to the cup game against Hull A at the Holderness Road ground, which ended as a draw. Rovers went through the next season losing just two games, defeating Britannia in the Times Cup final.

Rovers beat Hull A for the first time in 1889–90, and moved to their fifth ground, again down Hessle Road. The Red and Whites won the Times Cup for the third year running in 1891–92 beating York A in the final. 1892 saw Rovers play at the Boulevard for the first time and they leased the ground for three years from the following season. Only one away win was recorded this season and six home wins, but Rovers entered the Yorkshire Cup for the first time although they were knocked out by Dewsbury in the second round. In 1893 Rovers played out of the Boulevard, and they lost to Bradford Northern that season in the first round of the Yorkshire Cup. Amos Law, a drop kicker joined the club from Cleckheaton and Huddersfield, while George William Lofthouse played at the age of 14; the youngest ever player to turn out for the senior side.

In 1895 the Northern Football Union was founded, when the leading rugby union sides in the North of England broke away to form a league of their own, comprising 22 clubs. Rovers, then nicknamed "the redbreasts" did not join the new organisation and were instead promoted to the second division of the RFU finishing joint second. They moved to their first ground in East Hull in Craven Street off Holderness Road. In 1896–97, they were denied a place in the first division when several sides resigned but when the West Riding club dropped out, Rovers moved up.

Hull KR amalgamated with Albany Soccer Club. After a successful amalgamation the clubs resources they then went onto win the Yorkshire Cup for the first time beating Shipley 11–5 in the final. The club also won the league competition and beat the rest of the league 26–8 in a challenge match. Rovers applied to join the Northern Union and played their first match under the new code in 1897–98.

Rovers were elected into the inaugural Yorkshire Second competition in 1898–99 winning all 17 matches. A club record of 19 consecutive league play-off and cup wins was set in that season with the club subsequently defeating Heckmondwike in a promotion/relegation match to qualify for the Yorkshire Senior Competition. Hull Kingston Rovers were thus admitted into full membership of the Yorkshire Northern Union and finished 6th out of 16 beating Hull 8–2 in the first local derby on 16 September 1899, in front of a 14,000 crowd.

Early 20th century 
In 1901–02, the top Yorkshire clubs formed their own 'super league' and Rovers played in the Lancashire League finishing 5th out of 13. Hull Kingston Rovers were one of the new teams to join the second division and finished joint second.

In 1904–05, Rovers reached the Challenge Cup Final losing 0–6 to Warrington in front of a crowd of 19,638. In the first round on 4 March 1905, Rovers beat Brookland Rovers 73–5 with G.H. 'Tich' West scoring 53 of the points with 11 tries and 10 goals, still a club and world rugby league record. In 1906/07 they reached the final of the Yorkshire Cup only to lose to Bradford F.C. 5–8.

In 1908, Rovers gained a memorable 21–16 win over the first touring Australian side. In 1911/12 they finished 3rd out of 27 but lost 10–22 to Huddersfield in the final of the Yorkshire Cup. In 1912/13 Rovers finished 3rd again out of 26 clubs and lost to Wigan in the Championship semi final play-off and finished runners-up in the Yorkshire League Championship.

Leagues were suspended in 1915 due to the First World War. When an official regional league resumed on 18 January 1919, Rovers finished 19th out of 25. In 1920/21, Rovers finished top of the Rugby League but lost 14–16 to Hull F.C. in the play-off final at Headingley. They had their revenge in the Yorkshire Cup final beating Hull 2–0 to win their first cup as a professional side.

Rovers then moved to their second ground in East Hull, Old Craven Park, behind the tram and bus depot on the eastern end of Holderness Road in 1922. The land cost £18,281 and included 14 tennis courts. They lost their first match at the new ground 0-0-0 to 0–1–3 Wakefield Trinity on 2 September 1922, Albert Rosenfeld scoring Trinity's try. The club finished 4th out of 27 in the league and they won the League Championship Cup beating Huddersfield 15–5. In season 1923/4 Gilbert Austin voluntarily ended a run of 190 consecutive appearances when he was selected to play for Yorkshire, which he considered a great honour.

1924–25 saw Rovers finish 2nd in the league, win the League Championship Cup, the Yorkshire League Cup, were semi-finalists in the Yorkshire Cup and runners-up in the Challenge Cup final. In 1925/26 Rovers finished 6th and won the Yorkshire League Championship. In 1926/27 the club finished 6th out of 29 but managed to beat a touring New Zealand side 20–15.

In 1929–30 Rovers won the Yorkshire Cup beating Hunslet 13–7 in the final, and finished 6th in the league. In 1933/34 the club lost 4–10 to York F.C. in the Yorkshire Cup Final.

Hull Kingston Rovers sold Craven Park for £10,750 to the Greyhound Racing Company in 1938 due to financial difficulties, securing a 21-year lease to continue playing there.

Post-Second World War
Leagues were again suspended during the Second World War. When the league resumed in 1945 Rovers finished 18th out of 27. Between 1947 and 1957, Rovers finished between 17th and 29th in the league. Colin Hutton was Hull KR coach from 1957–70. In 1958 the club's fortunes started improving, finishing 18th out of 30. In 1959–60 the club finished 13th out of 30, the first time the club had finished in the top half of the table since 1930–31 – the players shared a bonus of £500 to share.

In 1961–62, the club won 17 successive matches and finished 8th out of 30. In 1962, the league was split into East and West of the Pennines; Huddersfield and Hull Kingston Rovers met at Headingley, Leeds in the first final of the Eastern Division Championship on Saturday 10 November 1962. Reigning champions, Huddersfield were favourites to lift the Eastern Division title, especially as Rovers were missing five first choice players with injuries. The Robins, however, set the early pace and were 10–0 up after 30 minutes. Despite a rally by Huddersfield, Rovers hung on to win 13–10. Rovers win was their first trophy for more than 30 years. In 1962–63 as two division rugby returned, they finished the season tenth out of sixteen in Division 1.

In 1963–64, Rovers reached the Challenge Cup Final at Wembley for the first time, losing 5–13 to Widnes in front of 84,488 fans. A return to Division One rugby was made in 1964–65 when Rovers finished 8th out of 30. In 1965/66 Rovers finished 12th out of 30. Rovers finished second in 1966–67, their highest place for over 40 years and the Yorkshire Cup was won with a 25–12 victory over Featherstone Rovers.

The club bought Roger Millward from Castleford on 8 August 1966 for the sum of £6,000. Rovers won the Mackeson Trophy for being the top points scorers in the Rugby League. Rovers won the Yorkshire Cup for the second year running in 1967–68, beating Hull 8–7 in the final; the first all-Hull final in 47 years. The club finished third in the league and lost 10–17 to Wakefield Trinity in the play-off final; Rovers were runners-up in the Yorkshire League and beat the Australians 27–15 with Millward scoring a hat-trick.

The 1970s
Johnny Whiteley joined Hull Kingston Rovers as coach in 1970 and stayed until 1972.

In the early 1970s Hull KR purchased a site at Winchester Avenue with the aim of building a new stadium. The plans never came to fruition and the site was later sold to a private developer. The profit made from this land was used to buy back Craven Park with greyhound racing continuing as a subsidiary concern.

New Zealand visited Craven Park on 8 September 1971. The Kiwis, playing their third game in five days, were unable to match the Robins, who beat the Kiwis 12–10.

Rovers won a further two Yorkshire Cup winners medals in 1971/72 and 1974/75. In 1973/74 the club was relegated to Division 2 when they finished 14 out of 16 in Division 1. Rovers gained promotion back to Division 1 the next year and won the Yorkshire Cup for the sixth time beating Wakefield Trinity 16–13 in the final. They also reached the semi-finals of the BBC2 Floodlit Trophy, the John Player Trophy and the Premiership Trophy. In 1975/76 the club were runners-up in the Yorkshire Cup losing 11–15 to Leeds.

Coach Harry Poole died in 1976/77, and Millward took over as temporary player-coach and in his first season guided the club to their first ever BBC2 Floodlit Trophy victory as the Robins beat St. Helens 26–11. The club finished 4th out of 16 in the league.

Phil Hogan was transferred to Hull KR in 1978 for a then world record fee of £35,000. Rovers topped the league for the first time since 1925. In 1979/80, under coach Roger Millward, Hull KR achieved a famous defeat of neighbours Hull, by a margin of 10–5 in the final of the Challenge Cup, at Wembley in front of 95,000 fans. A makeshift sign was left on the A63 (the major westerly road out of Hull) that read "last one out turn the lights off!" due to most of the city travelling to Wembley for the final. Also, a '10–5' bar is now situated inside Craven Park.

Steve Hubbard scored nine out of the ten points for Rovers. Millward played the full game, despite having his jaw broken early in the game. Earlier in the same season, Rovers had lost in the final of the BBC2 Floodlit Trophy against Hull.

1980s and early 1990s
In 1980/81, Millward retired as a player after having his jaw broken for the third time, the club finished 3rd in the league but lost 18–9 to Widnes in the final of the Challenge Cup in front of 94,496. Rovers lost in the final of the Yorkshire Cup 7–8 to Leeds but won the Premiership Trophy beating Hull 11–7. International full back George Fairbairn was signed from Wigan suring the summer of 1981 for a then world record fee of £72.500. In 1981/82 Rovers finished 4th in the league and lost in the final of the John Player Trophy 4–12 against Hull.

In 1982/83 Rovers finished as runners-up in the league. In 1983/84 Rovers were crowned champions of the 1st Division and went on to win the Divisional Premiership beating Castleford 18–10 in the final at Headingley; becoming the first team to win the Championship / Premiership double. In 1984–85 they nearly repeated the feat winning the Division 1 Championship but narrowly missing out in the final of the Premiership. Rovers also won the John Player Trophy beating Hull 12–0 in the final at Boothferry Park but lost 12–29 to Hull in the final of the Yorkshire Cup.

On 25 August 1985, professional rugby league was played for the first time on the Isle of Man. The Charity Shield between Hull Kingston Rovers and Challenge Cup winners Wigan drew a crowd of 4,066 to the Douglas Bowl. The final score was 34–6 to Wigan.

In 1985/86, Millward took Rovers to their sixth win in the Yorkshire Cup before they were defeated in the John Player Final and the Challenge Cup Final at Wembley narrowly losing 15–14 to Castleford. This proved to be Rovers last major final to date, as the team that had part dominated the English game faded away.

By the late 1980s, time had taken its toll on Craven Park stadium, following the Bradford City stadium fire, capacity was restricted and the cost of safety work spiraled. Major renovations were needed to bring it up to scratch. Large amounts of money were spent on the ground each year repairing sections but once one section was repaired another would fall into disrepair. In 1988/89, their last full season at Craven Park, Rovers were relegated to the 2nd Division and Millward decided to stand down as coach. Wright Properties Ltd purchased Craven Park from the club and the final game was played there on 9 April 1989.

A new stadium, New Craven Park, was built on a site off Preston Road. New Craven Park was officially opened on Sunday 24 September 1989 as Rovers beat Trafford Borough 48–8 in front of 8,500 spectators. Rovers started the new era convincingly, and were crowned Second Division champions with promotion back to the top flight.

George Fairbairn was brought in as a player-coach in 1992 for a record fee of £72,500. In 1994/95, Rovers were relegated to the third division despite finishing mid table.

1996–2006: Summer era
In 1996, the first tier of British rugby league clubs played the inaugural Super League season and changed from a winter to a summer season. When the Super League competition had been proposed, it was suggested Hull Kingston Rovers should merge with Hull F.C. to form 'Humberside' and compete in the Super League. This was resisted but despite finishing top of the Third Division, they were not promoted. As the sport in Britain entered a new era, it would be ten years before Rovers rose again to the top level of the game.

Rovers were again crowned champions of the now renamed Second Division in 1996 and were this time promoted to the First Division. Hull Kingston Rovers entered administration in January 1997, and, but for the diligence of administrator Edward Klemka and the fund-raising activity of the Hull Kingston Rovers Supporters Group, the 1997 season would almost certainly have been their last. On the field though, Rovers won the Challenge Cup plate in its only season, beating Hunslet at Wembley 60–14. Then, against all odds, they finished second in the division the following season.

Rovers finished second in the league in 1998, and came close to a Grand Final spot with a Super League spot at stake. The Robins were expected to go one better in 1999 and topped the table for most of the season before their run ended and the final six games saw them drop from first place to sixth, missing out on a play-off place. Disappointment followed the year after when the Robins finished in seventh place in the league after a mid-season collapse and exited the play-offs in the first round.

After being in Administration from 1997 an acceptable buyer for the club was finally found in 2000, and the club came out of administration. Don Robinson took control in 2001 and Gary Wilkinson became head coach. Despite reaching the National Cup Final and finishing fourth in the league, Wilkinson made way for the club's first overseas coach, Steve Linnane.

Under Linnane, the Robins came within eighty minutes of their first Grand Final appearance in 2002, after a largely successful end to the season, while the arrival of former player Nick Halafihi as chief executive, boosted the club's off-field activities.

In 2004 the club appointed Mal Reilly as Director of Rugby and Martin Hall as first team coach after Steve Linnane's resignation. But Reilly left the club midway through the season, while Hall took the club to the play-off semi-final before leaving once the season had finished. Halafihi also left the club.

Harvey Howard was appointed first team coach and Paul Lakin appointed chief executive in late 2004. Howard was dismissed shortly before the Northern Rail Cup Final, which Rovers went on to win 18–16 over Castleford, with the Robins utilising the temporary player-coaching abilities of James Webster.

Permanently taking over from Howard was the former Toulouse coach, Justin Morgan. October 2005 who saw the club still in the National League, after failing to get past the semi final stage of the National League One play-offs. Rovers also started a number of ground improvements, including the laying of a new pitch, and widening of the playing surface. They also made some significant signings for the 2006 season.

Up to that time unbeaten in their 2006 fixtures, in early June they were drawn to meet Super League side Warrington, in the quarter final of the Challenge Cup. It was arguably their biggest fixture for some years. Against all the odds the Robins won, 40–36, their best result in the competition since their 1980 Challenge Cup win against local rivals Hull. This result also created a new club record of 18 consecutive wins. The victory set up a semi final tie against Super League leaders, St. Helens.

Rovers also progressed to the final of the Northern Rail Cup for the second successive season, against Leigh at Bloomfield Road, Blackpool on 16 July. Leigh won this game 22–18, thus ending Rovers' twenty four match unbeaten run. The club's Challenge Cup campaign also came to an abrupt halt, Rovers gamely succumbing 50–0 to triple-winning St Helens at the Galpharm Stadium, Huddersfield.

September 2006 saw Rovers crowned National League One Minor Premier winners, and qualify for an automatic place in the National League One play-off semi final at Craven Park against Widnes whom they beat 29–22 to reach the first Grand Final in their history, which they won 29–16, earning a place in the following season's Super League competition.

2007–2014: Super League
After close-season signings and an overseas training camp, Rovers made a better than expected start to their first Super League campaign, winning their first two games – Wakefield Trinity at home and Huddersfield away. After suffering a reversal to Harlequins RL, they then had an away win (26–16) at Wigan, followed by a hard-fought victory at home to in-form Leeds, to go joint top of the early season table. However, inconsistent form, injuries and the effects of the first Super League sending-off (after 96 games) saw Rovers slip to near the bottom, despite a historic double away win over Wigan, and beating local rivals Hull at the Millennium Magic weekend. Improved late season results, including the safety-clinching win in the derby against Hull by the shock margin of 6–42 (played at the KC Stadium), ensured Super League status for another campaign.

Hull KR made significant changes to their squad for the 2008 season, which saw eleven new players brought in and a number of players released or sold. On 2 May the club announced that former captain James Webster had been released from the final six months of his contract due to a three to four-month lay off with a shoulder injury. He was replaced by new signing Michael Dobson, who was formerly a target of Hull. Canberra Raiders scrum half took squad number 26, and made his début against Harlequins RL on 25 May, scoring two tries. Rovers finished one point away from a play-off place.

2009 saw further consolidation of Hull KR's Super League status with away victories at St Helens, Wigan and Warrington in a seven match winning run, taking Rovers briefly to the top position in the table. A less successful spell followed, due to inconsistency, injuries and international calls, but by mid August 2009 Rovers were fourth in the table, five points clear of the next placed side.

2011 saw the end of Justin Morgan's reign as head coach and the club appointed Craig Sandercock as the new head coach for the 2012 season. Finishing 10th in his first season as a head coach and then making the play-offs in 2013, finishing 8th.

Despite making several big name signings for the 2014 season, Rovers failed to make any kind of impact in the league and with 8 games remaining they parted company with Sandercock, appointing assistant coach and ex-player Chris Chester as the new First-team coach of Hull KR. Chester could not steer the club to a playoff spot in his first 8 games in charge and they finished the season in 9th position.

2015–present: Progress and Challenge Cup final
Chester took charge of his first full season as Hull Kingston Rovers Head Coach in 2015 and despite a mass clearout of the 2014 squad, he made several high-profile signings, notably, Ken Sio, Albert Kelly, Maurice Blair, Terry Campese, Mitch Allgood, Ryan Bailey and Darrell Goulding.

The club's first major final in 29 years ended in a record defeat along with the highest losing margin in a Challenge Cup final against Leeds by 50 points to nil.

Chester was sacked on 24 February 2016 just three matches into the 2016 season (two losses and a draw). James Webster took the reins, and led the Robins to four defeats in the following five games; the club also suffered a shock cup loss to Championship side Oldham R.L.F.C., as well as relegation to the Kingstone Press Championship in the 2016 Million Pound Game.

In September 2016, it was announced that Tim Sheens would be coaching the club for the next three years. In his first season, Rovers were promoted without having to play the Million Pound Game.

Over the next three seasons, Hull KR finished 10th, 11th and 11th.  In the 2020 Super League season, the club only avoided relegation due to the Covid-19 Pandemic and Toronto's expulsion from the league.

In the 2021 Super League season, Hull KR were predicted to fight against relegation after finishing the previous season on the bottom of the table.  The club however finished in sixth place and qualified for the playoffs for the first time since 2013.  In the elimination playoff against Warrington, Hull KR produced a major upset winning the game 19–0 and booking their place in the semi-final against Catalans Dragons.
In the 2021 semi-final, Hull KR lost the match 28–10 at a sold out Stade Gilbert Brutus.

Hull Kingston Rovers started the 2022 Super League season looking to build on the events of 2021. Midway through the year however, head coach Tony Smith announced he would be leaving at the end of the year.  In May 2022, Hull KR reached the semi-final of the Challenge Cup were defeated by Huddersfield at Elland Road.  In July 2022, Smith left Hull Kingston Rovers after a humiliating loss to Toulouse Olympique and he was replaced by interim head coach Danny McGuire. Hull Kingston Rovers would finish the year in 8th place on the table.

Stadium

1895–1922: Craven Street

Hull KR first played on Craven Street in 1895 and played there until 1922 when they built and developed a bigger stadium at Old Craven Park with better facilities.

1922–1989: Old Craven Park

Hull KR moved to Craven Park from their cramped Craven Street ground in 1922. The club purchased and developed a site behind the tram and bus depot on the eastern end of Holderness Road and it hosted its first game on 2 September 1922. Craven Park also hosted greyhound racing. Hull Kingston Rovers sold the ground to the Greyhound Racing Company in 1930s due to financial difficulties, securing a long term lease to continue playing there.

In the early 1970s Hull Kingston Rovers purchased a site at Winchester Avenue with the aim of building a new stadium there. These plans never came to fruition and the site was later sold to a private developer. The profit made from this land was used to buy back Craven Park with greyhound racing continuing as a subsidiary concern. Following the Bradford City stadium fire, capacity was restricted and costs of safety work spiraled. With the club in debt the ground was sold to developers and the final game was played there on 9 April 1989.

1989–present: Craven Park

The club moved to the new ground in 1989 from the "Old" Craven Park which was sited on Holderness Road. The first match was played against Trafford Borough packing in a full capacity 8,500 crowd to watch.

In 2006 the ground and pitch were substantially improved as the club sought a return to the top flight of English rugby league. On 25 January 2014,  Hull Kingston Rovers announced that it had secured a new stadium naming rights partnership with local communications provider, KC. Under a five-year agreement, Craven Park was renamed the KC Lightstream Stadium. After a corporate rebrand, the stadium was renamed again as KCOM Craven Park. In 2019 it was renamed the Hull College Craven Park Stadium.

A further renaming deal was signed in January 2022 when Hull-based company, Sewell Group, signed a two-year deal for rights to the stadium naming. The stadium to be known as the Sewell Group Craven Park.

On 28 March 2022 the club announced that they had purchased the ground from Kingston Community Developments Ltd (KCDL). KCDL had been the club's landlord since the 1990s.

Colours and badge

Colours
Hull Kingston Rovers have played in red jerseys throughout their history. From their inception the club's colours were agreed to be red jerseys with a blue band across the chest, white shorts and red socks.

Badge

Hull KR's badge is similar to city rivals Hull F.C. in that they use the city coat of arms, but KR's club badge is mainly red within a shield.

Kit sponsors and manufacturers

Rivalries

The club's main rivalry is with cross-city side Hull F.C. in which they contest the Hull Derby.

Players

2023 squad

2023 transfers

Gains

Losses

Notable former players

Greatest ever team 
In 2012, Hull KR supporters voted for the best players in the club's history. The players who received the most votes in each position were named in the club's "Greatest Ever Hull KR 13".

Other notable players 
These players have either won Challenge Cup, Rugby Football League Championship, Yorkshire County Cup, Yorkshire League; played during Super League; received a Testimonial match; been international representatives before, or after, their time at Hull Kingston Rovers; or are notable outside of rugby league. For a comprehensive list of players, see List of Hull Kingston Rovers players. Figures in (brackets) are total club appearances.

 Allan Agar
 Chris Anderson
 Gilbert Austin (348) 1919 – 1928
 Damian Ball
 Dwayne Barker
 Arthur Beetson
 Edwin "Ted" Bonner (#13) (72) circa 1962
 Kerry Boustead
 B. Britton (332) circa 1924 – circa 1930
 Mark Broadhurst
 Matty Brooks
 Arthur Bunting (237) 1959 – circa 1968
 Brian Burwell (#4) (93) circa 1962
 George Carmichael captain circa 1936
 Leslie Chamberlain
 Josh Charnley
 Chris Chester
 Dean Clark
 Geoffrey Clarkson
 Joel Clinton
 Ben Cockayne
 Liam Colbon
 J. Cook (365) 1920 – 1931
 Matt Cook
 Paul Cooke
 Colin Cooper (#7) circa-1968
 Philip "Phil" Coupland circa-1968
 Robin "Bob" Coverdale (161) 1957 – circa 1963
 Mick Crane
 H. "Scrubber" Dale (305) circa 1929 – circa 1937
 Andy Dannatt
 Michael Dixon
 Michael Dobson
 John Dorahy
 Jim Drake (78) 1961 – 1965
 Paul Eastwood
 David "Dave" Elliott (300) circa 1962 – 1968
 Andrew Ellis
 Asuquo "Zook" Ema circa 1983 (Testimonial match 1990)
 Craig Farrell
 Daniel Fitzhenry
 Paul Fletcher (Testimonial match 1998)
 Byron Ford
 Leslie "Les" Foster (#8) circa-1968
 Neil Fox
 Peter Fox (born 1984)
 Ben Galea
 Jim Gannon
 Stanley Gene
 Jon Goddard
 Blake Green
 Mike Hall
 Graeme Hallas
 Ian Hardman
 Lewis Harris, 1920s.
 Robert "Bob" Harris (#5) (128) 1959 – c 1964
 Danny Hill
Dale Holdstock
Roy Holdstock
 Chaz I'Anson
 Fred Jowett
 Cyril Kellett (#1) (382) 1957 – 1967
 Bryn Knowelden
 Sam Latus
 Tracey Lazenby
 Paul Longstaff (#5) circa-1968
 Rhys Lovegrove
 John Lydiat (Testimonial match 1982)
 Terrence "Terry" Major (#3) (274) 1959 – circa 1969
 J. McIntyre (303) circa 1920 – circa 1925
 Wilfred "Wilf" McWatt (323)
 Frankie Mariano
 Brian Mennell (#10) début in 1963–64 Challenge Cup Final circa-1968
 Luke Menzies
 Gavin Miller
 John Millington
 John Moore (430) 1962 – (Testimonial match 1973)
 Iain Morrison
 Gareth Morton
 Peter Murphy (#12) (36) circa 1962
 Scott Murrell
 Jason Netherton
 Kirk Netherton
 Clint Newton
 Bryan Niebling
 Mark O'Neill
 Jonty Parkin
 Graham 'The Cornish Express' Paul (#2) (197) 1958 – 1966
 Dave Page
 Gareth Price
 Gary Prohm
 Andy Raleigh
 Joseph "Joe" Ramsden (348)
 Michael Ratu
 Dan Rees
 Emlyn Richards (109) 1945 – 1952
 Leroy Rivett
 Ian Robinson (Testimonial match 1984)
 Michael Smith
 Bright Sodje
 John "Jack" T. Spamer (440) circa 1928 – circa 1938
 Scott Spaven
 Jon Steel
 David Stephenson
 Francis Stephenson
 Lynton Stott
 Anthony Sullivan 1988 – 1991
 Whetu Taewa
 Ryan Tandy
 David Tangata-Toa
 Latham Tawhai
 John Taylor
 Scott Taylor
 Len Trump
 Derek 'Rocky' Turner (141) 1950 – 1955
 Yank van Rooyen circa-1920
 Michael Vella
 David Wainwright (#1) circa-1968
 Chev Walker
 Danny Ward
 Dave Watson
 Kevin Watson
 Liam Watts
 Jake Webster
 James Webster
 Pat Weisner
 Kris Welham
 C.T. Westerdale (319) circa 1924 – circa 1930
 Scott Wheeldon
 Jon Wilkin
 Desi Williams
 Dave Wilson

Coaching team

Past coaches
Also see :Category:Hull Kingston Rovers coaches.

 Lewis Harris
 Bryn Knowelden 1952–1955
 Colin Hutton 1957–1970
 Johnny Whiteley 1970–1972
 Harry Poole 1975–1977
 Roger Millward 1977–1991
 George Fairbairn 1991–1994
 Steve Crooks 1994–1997
 Dave Harrison 1997–2000
 Gary Wilkinson 2000–2002
 Steve Linnane 2002–2004
 Martin Hall 2003–2004
 Mal Reilly 2003–2004
 Harvey Howard 2004–2005
 Justin Morgan 2005–2011
 Craig Sandercock 2012–2014
 Chris Chester 2014–2016
 James Webster 2016–2017
 Tim Sheens 2017–2019
 James Webster (caretaker) 2019
 Tony Smith 2019–2022
 Danny McGuire (interim) 2022–present

Seasons

Super League era

Honours

League
First Division / Super League
Winners (5):1922–23, 1924–25, 1978–79, 1983–84, 1984–85
Second Division / Championship
Winners (2): 2006, 2017
RFL Championship Leaders' Shield
Winners (2): 2006, 2017
RFL Yorkshire League
Winners (2): 1924–25, 1925–26
Eastern Division Championship
Winners (1): 1962–63

Cup

Challenge Cup
Winners (1): 1979–80
Premiership
Winners (2): 1980–81, 1983–84
League Cup
Winners (1): 1984–85
BBC2 Floodlit Trophy
Winners (1): 1977–78
RFL Yorkshire Cup
Winners (7): 1920–21, 1929–30, 1966–67, 1967–68, 1971–72, 1974–75, 1985–86
RFU Yorkshire Cup
Winners (1): 1897
Championship Cup
Winners (1): 2005

Club records

Match records
Goals: 14 (10 placed 4 drop) by Alf 'Bunker' Carmichael vs Merthyr Tydfil, 8 October 1910
14 by Mike Fletcher vs Whitehaven, 18 March 1990
14 by Colin Armstrong vs Nottingham City, 19 August 1990
14 by Damien Couturier vs Halifax, Northern Rail Cup, 23 April 2006
Tries: 11 by George Henry 'Tich' West vs Brooklands Rovers, 4 March 1905
Points: 53 (11 tries, 10 goals) by George Henry 'Tich' West vs Brooklands Rovers, 4 March 1905 (a rugby league world record)

Season records
Goals: 199 by Mike Fletcher, 1989–90
Tries: 45 by Gary Prohm, 1984–85
Points: 450 by Mike Fletcher, 1989–90

Career records
Goals: 1,268 by Mike Fletcher, 1987–98
Tries: 207 by Roger Millward, 1966–80
Points: 2,760 by Mike Fletcher, 1987–98
Appearances: 481 by Mike Smith, 1974–1991

Other records
Highest score: 100–6 vs Nottingham City, 19 August 1990
Highest against: 6–84 vs Wigan (KCOM Craven Park), 1 April 2013
Attendance record: 22,282 vs Hull F.C. (Craven Park), 7 October 1922
Attendance record: 16,084 vs Hull F.C. (Craven Park), 20 April 1984 (post-war record)
Attendance record: 18,000 vs Hull F.C. (Craven Street), 11 March 1922
Attendance record: 27,670 vs Hull F.C. (Boothferry Park), 3 April 1953
Attendance record: 12,090 vs Hull F.C (KCOM Craven Park), 30 March 2018 (current stadium record)
All-time attendance record: 95,000 vs Hull F.C. (Wembley Stadium), 3 May 1980 – 1980 Challenge Cup Final
Attendance record vs international touring team: 13,000 vs Australasia (Craven Street), 24 September 1921 – 1921–22 Kangaroo Tour
Longest sequence of appearances: 190 by Gilbert Austin, 1918–19 to 1923–24
International appearances: 45 plus 2 as sub by Roger Millward between 1966–78

Notes

References

External links

 
 Hull KR Junior Robins
 Hull KR history

 
Rugby clubs established in 1882
Super League teams
Sport in Kingston upon Hull
1882 establishments in England
English rugby league teams